Norbert Némedi (born 1 June 1977 in Kecskemét) is a Hungarian football player who currently plays for Kecskeméti TE.

External links
Profile on hlsz.hu 
Profile on kecskemetite.hu 
Némedi' stats 

1977 births
Living people
People from Kecskemét
Hungarian footballers
Association football midfielders
Egri FC players
Újpest FC players
Szolnoki MÁV FC footballers
Fehérvár FC players
Rákospalotai EAC footballers
Nyíregyháza Spartacus FC players
Kecskeméti TE players
Sportspeople from Bács-Kiskun County